Arkansas Aviation Historical Society is a non-profit organization promoting aviation. It created the Arkansas Aviation Hall of Fame in 1980, and recently created college scholarships in hopes of encouraging young people to pursue aviation careers. 
The Aviation Hall of Fame honors individuals who played a great role in aviation and aerospace history on the national or Arkansas scene.  Records are hosted by Butler Center for Arkansas Studies, Arkansas Studies Institute, Central Arkansas Library System, in Little Rock, Arkansas.

History
New members to the Hall of Fame were inducted annually from 1980 to 2010, and again in 2015. Arkansas Aviation Hall of Fame inductees for 2015 were Jim Gaston, John Knight and James R. Risner.
The hall of fame was based at the new Aerospace Education Center, 3301 East Roosevelt Road, Little Rock, Arkansas, near Little Rock National Airport, in 1995.  When the Aerospace Education Center closed its doors on January 1, 2011, records were moved to the Butler Center for Arkansas Studies, Arkansas Studies Institute, which still hosts the records.

In 2015, the society awarded its first two scholarships, while expressing the need for aviators to support the dreams of potential young pilots.  Two students at Arkansas' collegiate aviation school, Henderson State University in Arkadelphia, received scholarships of $2,000 each.

Hall of Fame Inductees
1980
J. Caroll Cone,  Nathan Gordon, Louise McPhetridge Thaden,  James S. McDonnell Jr., Charles M. Taylor

1981
Leighton Collins, Case Hough, Robert Snowden Jr., Admiral John S. Thach

1982
Raymond J. Ellis, Captain Field Kindley, Claude Holbert

1983
Major General Earl T. Ricks Jr., Lynn Helms, Albert A. Vollmecke

1984
Brig. Gen. John D. Howe, Major General Winston P. Wilson, Eddie Holland

1985
Brigadier General William T. Seawell, General John Paul McConnell, Major Pierce W. McKennon

1986
Major General Frank A. Bailey, M.T. “Cy” Bond, Earl Rowland

1987
Major John H. White, Lucien M. Tallac

1988
Richard Collins, Lt. Wendel A. Robertson

1989
Captain E. Scott McCuskey, Sanford N. McDonnell

1990
Rear Admiral George M. "Skip" Furlong Jr.,  John Paul Hammerschmidt

1991
Rear Admiral F. Taylor Brown, Frederick Smith

1992
Adm. William Newell Small, Lieutenant Colonel Woodrow W. Crockett

1993
Emma W. Hall, Seth Ward

1994
Lieutenant Colonel Hugh Mills, James Rodgers, Jack Stephens

1995
Colonel Richard O. Covey USAF, Floyd Fulkerson, Gov. Winthrop Rockefeller

1996
Maj. Gen. Lewis E. Lyle, Lieutenant Roy Rushing, Issac T. Gilliam IV

1997
Houston J. Burford, Richard C. Butler, Harvey C. Couch Jr., Wheat Goss, Bart Gray, Dr. Lafayette Harris, Harry W. Pfeifer Jr., Arthur Phillips, Jack Pickens, John Potts, Raymond Rebsamen, J. V. Satterfield, Howard Stebbins III, Everett Tucker Jr., and Kenneth Pat Wilson

1998
Milton P. Crenchaw, J. Scott Hamilton, Colonel Charles Peter O'Sullivan

1999
Frank G. Tinker Jr., Fred K. Darragh Jr., Gen. Horace M. Wade

2000
Jim Burnett, Anthony DeSalvo, Lieutenant General Charles R. Hamm

2001
Alice Walton, Jim Younkin

2002
Rodney Slater, H.A. Thomas

2003
Thomas N. Smith Jr., Brigadier General William H. Webster, Captain Wilbur West

2004
Lieutenant Colonel Robert Hite, James Stamps, Robert M. Wilson

2005
Marlon D. Green, Virginia "Mary" Proctor, Daryl Riddell

2006
Richard N. Holbert, Donald L. Holbert, Robert A. Younkin

2007
Adolphus H. "Pat" Bledsoe Jr., Zemery Melvern "Jack" Stell, Dennis R. Gardisser Ph.D., P.E.

2008
Paul Irving "Pappy" Gunn, Scott E. Parazynski M.D.

2009
Greg Arnold, Colonel Billy G. Edens

2010
Brigadier General Paul Page Douglas Jr., James C. "Bud" Mars, Mary F. Silitch

2015
Jim Gaston, John Knight and James R. Risner

2016
Lynn C Hooper, David Wallace, Jesse Vincent

2017
Zane Anderson, Harold Johnson, General William Smith

2018
Gwen Batie Blue, Cornelius Robinson Coffey, Ernest Ambort, Dr. Jerry Robinson

2019
Ronald L. Herron, Russ Amos, J.O. Dockery, Don Clark Ruggles, Dennis F. Cantrell,

References

External links
The Arkansas Aviation Historical Society
The Arkansas Aviation Historical Society Hall of Fame Videos, YouTube
Arkansas Air & Military Museum
Gallery: 2010 inductees
Henderson State University aviation

Aviation in Arkansas
Aviators from Arkansas